William Francis Thompson (born St. Cloud, Minnesota 1888, died 7 November 1965)  was an American ichthyologist and fisheries scientist.

He researched the exploitation and management of the stocks of Pacific halibut  for the fisheries department in British Columbia in the early 20th century, as well as the restoration Fraser River sockeye salmon run in the mid twentieth century.

Thompson attended Stanford University for his doctoral research. His dissertation was titled, The biology of the halibut, with particular reference to marking experiments. He completed the research for his dissertation in 1930 at the Hopkins Marine Station in Pacific Grove, California. Thompson was the director of the School of Fisheries at the University of Washington from 1934, and between 1937 and 1943 he was the director of the international Pacific Salmon Commission working in Canada and Alaska. He founded the Fisheries Research Institute of the University of Washington in 1947. Thompson retired in 1958 at the age of 70.

See also
:Category:Taxa named by William Francis Thompson

References 

American ichthyologists
Stanford University alumni
1888 births
1965 deaths
20th-century American zoologists
Fisheries scientists